MeiMei Kuo is an actress and a member of Taiwanese girl band Hey Girl (formerly Hei Se Hui Mei Mei). Her birth name is Kuo Chieh Chi.  MeiMei is the younger sister of Ulzzang model JieJie.

Career

Host
Channel V
《Blackies》(我愛黑澀會)
《Popular in House》(流行 in House)
《Pop Beauty Wind》(美眉普普風)
《Lollipop》(模范棒棒堂)(Assistant Host)
TVBS-G
《Entertainments News – Beauty Bao Bao》(娛樂新聞 ─ 美眉ㄅ ㄠ ˋㄅ ㄠ ˋ)
China Television(Taiwan)
《Guess》(我猜我猜我猜猜猜)(Assistant Host)
Others
《2007 Taipei Most HIGH New Year City Soiree》(2007台北最HIGH新年城跨年晚會)
<<Garena Talk>>(DJ Garena Talk Talk>

Endorsement
 Edwin Jeans
 New Zu Chivalry(新蜀山劍俠) Online
 Hi-Chew(「嗨啾」軟糖)
 Cheng-Hsien Gyrus Sushi(爭鮮迴轉壽司)
 Le tea cherry soda(「樂堤」cherry微發泡蘇打)
 KnightsBridge Clothes
 Pandora's Sweety Wardrobe Clothes(潘朵拉的甜蜜衣櫥服飾)
 Maybelline Moisturizing Lip Stick(媚必臨水唇膏)
 Yuskin Hand Cream
 Maidenform

Album
 I Love Blackies(我愛黑澀會)（2006-07-14, Linfair Records Ltd.）
 A Private Day of Beauty – Honey (美眉私密的一天 ─ 甜心轟炸機)（2006-12-15, Linfair Records Ltd.）
 Beauty Private Party (美眉私密Party)（2007-06-07, Linfair Records Ltd.）
 Brown Sugar Macchiato OST(黑糖瑪奇朵電視原聲帶)（CD+DVD）（2007-08-31, EMI Taiwan, Capitol Records Ltd.）
 Hey Girl(黑Girl首張同名專輯) （2008-08-29, Warner Music Taiwan Ltd.）

Music Video
《Male Servant》男傭
《Blackie Teenage Club》我愛黑澀會
《Shining Kiss》
《Sunny doll》晴天娃娃
《Shake it Baby》
《The Brown Sugar Show》黑糖秀
《Hapiness Bubbles》幸福的泡泡
《Call me JieJie》叫姊姊
《OOXX》
《Girl》女生
《Hakuna Matata》哈庫呐瑪塔塔

Filmography

Drama/TV Series

Website Link

Woo.com（Another Entrance）

References

1985 births
Living people
Musicians from Taipei
Actresses from Taipei
21st-century Taiwanese singers
21st-century Taiwanese women singers